Franklin Otis Booth Jr. (September 28, 1923 – June 15, 2008) was an American billionaire newspaper executive and investor. He was a Los Angeles Times executive and early investor in Berkshire Hathaway, which made him a billionaire. Booth was also a philanthropist and a great-grandson of Gen. Harrison Gray Otis, founder of the Times.

Career
During the 1950s, Booth was responsible for overseeing the printing of the newspaper. In 1968 he was named corporate vice president of Times Mirror Corporation in charge of forest products and commercial printing.

Booth's tenure at the Times overlapped with that of his second cousin and close friend, Otis Chandler, the publisher who held the reins of the paper from 1960 to 1980. The cousins shared a passion for the outdoors; Booth, also known as Otis, surfed, fished and hunted.

During his early years at the Times, Booth began investing in real estate with his friend Charles Munger, now vice chairman of Berkshire Hathaway Inc. They worked on two real estate projects in Pasadena and quadrupled their money. It was Munger who introduced Booth to Warren Buffett in 1963. Booth's early decision to invest with Buffett left him with shares in Berkshire Hathaway amounting to a 1.4% stake in the company. Booth was a billionaire and one of the largest investors in the company, according to a 2005 Forbes magazine article cited in Booth's Times obituary.

In 1972 Booth retired from the Times and operated several businesses before trying his hand at citrus farming and raising livestock.

Personal life
Booth was born September 28, 1923, in Pasadena, where he spent his youth. By age 16 he was a student at the California Institute of Technology. He earned a bachelor's degree in electrical engineering in 1944 and then served two years in the U.S. Naval Reserve. After his discharge he earned a master's degree in business administration and a graduate degree in engineering in 1948, both from Stanford University.

Over the years, Booth donated to many causes including the Harvard-Westlake School and the Natural History Museum of Los Angeles County.

He was married and had six children. 

He died June 15, 2008, in his home in Los Angeles from complications of ALS, also known as Lou Gehrig's disease.

References

External links
Los Angeles Times website
Berkshire Hathaway website

1923 births
2008 deaths
American billionaires
American publishing chief executives
American investors
American newspaper executives
Berkshire Hathaway people
Businesspeople from Los Angeles
California Institute of Technology alumni
Neurological disease deaths in California
Deaths from motor neuron disease
Los Angeles Times people
Otis family
People from Pasadena, California
Stanford Graduate School of Business alumni
Stanford University alumni
20th-century American businesspeople